"Perfect Fit" is a song written by Northern Irish singer-songwriter Van Morrison and included on his 1995 album, Days Like This.

Recording and composition
It was recorded at the sessions for Days Like This which took place at Wool Hall Studios at Beckington and Real World in Bath in 1993–1994.

Michelle Rocca, Morrison's longtime girlfriend, featured on the cover of the Days Like This album and the couple had become engaged in March 1995 shortly before the release of the album.
Morrison had dedicated his song  "Have I Told You Lately" to Rocca when he appeared at the IRMA awards in Dublin, during the same month.

"Perfect Fit" was the opening tune on the album and was described by Johnny Rogan as being "a transparent paean to Rocca." The song opens with the lines:

Now baby just lately you've been holding back too much
Your looks and my language, this could be the perfect touch
What you are asking fits with everything on my list
This could be the perfect fit

The song features prominent backing vocals by Irish singer songwriter Brian Kennedy.

Personnel on original release
Van Morrison – vocals, harmonica
Ronnie Johnson – electric guitar
Nicky Scott – bass
Geoff Dunn – drums
Teena Lyle – recorder, backing vocals
Kate St. John – alto saxophone
Pee Wee Ellis – tenor saxophone
Leo Green – tenor saxophone
Matthew Holland – trumpet
Brian Kennedy – backing vocals
Horns arranged by Pee Wee Ellis

Notes

References
Heylin, Clinton (2003). Can You Feel the Silence? Van Morrison: A New Biography, Chicago Review Press, 
Rogan, Johnny (2006). Van Morrison: No Surrender, London: Vintage Books  

1995 singles
Van Morrison songs
Songs written by Van Morrison
Song recordings produced by Van Morrison